Amsterdamer Straße/Gürtel is an interchange station on the Cologne Stadtbahn lines 13 and 16, located in the Cologne district of Nippes. The station lies on the junction of Amsterdamer Straße with the Cologne Belt (Gürtel), after which the station is named.

The station was opened in 1974 and consists of both an elevated and an at-grade station, each with two side platforms and two rail tracks.

See also 
 List of Cologne KVB stations

External links 
 station info page 

Cologne KVB stations
Nippes, Cologne
Railway stations in Germany opened in 1974